A false etymology (fake etymology, popular etymology, etymythology, pseudo-etymology, or par(a)etymology) is a popular but false belief about the origin or derivation of a specific word. It is sometimes called a folk etymology, but this is also a technical term in linguistics.

Such etymologies often have the feel of urban legends and can be more colorful and fanciful than the typical etymologies found in dictionaries, often involving stories of unusual practices in particular subcultures (e.g. Oxford students from non-noble families being supposedly forced to write sine nobilitate by their name, soon abbreviated to s.nob., hence the word snob). Many recent examples are "backronyms" (acronyms made up to explain a term), such as posh for "port outward, starboard homeward".

Source and influence
Erroneous etymologies can exist for many reasons.  Some are reasonable interpretations of the evidence that happen to be false.  For a given word there may often have been many serious attempts by scholars to propose etymologies based on the best information available at the time, and these can be later modified or rejected as linguistic scholarship advances.  The results of medieval etymology, for example, were plausible given the insights available at the time, but have often been rejected by modern linguists.  The etymologies of humanist scholars in the early modern period began to produce more reliable results, but many of their hypotheses have also been superseded.

Other false etymologies are the result of specious and untrustworthy claims made by individuals, such as the unfounded claims made by Daniel Cassidy that hundreds of common English words such as baloney, grumble, and bunkum derive from the Irish language.

Some etymologies are part of urban legends, and seem to respond to a general taste for the surprising, counter-intuitive and even scandalous. One common example has to do with the phrase rule of thumb, meaning "a rough guideline". An urban legend has it that the phrase refers to an old English law under which a man could legally beat his wife with a stick no thicker than his thumb.

In the United States, some of these scandalous legends have had to do with racism and slavery; common words such as picnic, buck, and crowbar have been alleged to stem from derogatory terms or racist practices. The "discovery" of these alleged etymologies is often believed by those who circulate them to draw attention to racist attitudes embedded in ordinary discourse. On one occasion, the use of the word niggardly led to the resignation of a US public official because it sounded similar to the unrelated word nigger.

Derivational-Only Popular Etymology (DOPE) versus Generative Popular Etymology (GPE)

Ghil'ad Zuckermann proposes a clear-cut distinction between Derivational-Only Popular Etymology (DOPE) and Generative Popular Etymology (GPE):

"DOPE consists of etymological reanalysis of a pre-existent lexical item [...] The DOPE producer is applying his/her Apollonian Tendency, the wish to describe and create order, especially with unfamiliar information or new experience [...], the craving for meaningfulness." DOPE is "merely passive", "mistaken derivation, where there is a rationalization ex post-facto."

GPE, on the other hand, involves the introduction of a new sense (meaning) or a new lexical item – see, for example, phono-semantic matching.

See also

List of common false etymologies of English words
Back-formation
Backronym
Bongo-Bongo (linguistics)
Chinese word for "crisis"
Eggcorn
Etymological fallacy
False cognate
False friend
Just-so story
Linguistic interference
OK
Phonestheme
Phono-semantic matching
Pseudoscientific language comparison
Semantic change

Notes

References

External links
 Richard Lederer, Spook Etymology on the Internet
 Popular Fallacies – the Nonsense Nine

Etymology
Error
Folklore
Urban legends
Misconceptions
Pseudolinguistics
Semantic relations

it:Paretimologia#Paretimologia in senso lato
pt:Etimologia popular